The Kocher Building, also known as La Giralda is a two-story steel and concrete framed Spanish Eclectic style commercial building in Carmel-by-the-Sea, California. It was designated as an important commercial building in the city's Downtown Historic District Property Survey, on September 4, 2002. The building is occupied by La Bicyclette Restaurant on the ground floor.

History

Dr. Rudolph Kocher brought in the architects, Blaine & Olsen of Oakland, California, to design La Giralda, on the northwest corner of located Dolores Street and Seventh Avenue, across the street from the El Paseo Building. The building was built for Kocher's offices and included the Dolores Pharmacy. When Blaine & Olsen visited Seville, Spain in 1922, they were inspired by the 12th-century Giralda bell tower.

The building project began in August 1927 but was not completed until February 1928. Kocher moved his practice into the new building. Raymond Brownell, also located to the new building that same year. Kocher lived in the apartments on the upper floor of La Giralda. John W. Claywell opened a pharmacy on the ground floor on April 16, 1928.

The two-story building has a signature polygonal tower, exterior wall cladding textured cement stucco, decorated with colorful panels of Spanish tile. It is capped with a low-pitched hipped roof. There is decorative corbeling under the openings. It has two stucco-clad chimneys. The dragon-headed wrought iron grille work is the best example of wrought iron work of blacksmith Francis Whitaker in Carmel. The second story balcony has French doors that open out onto a balcony with views of Dolores Street. The Dolores Street side of the building shows three arched windows.

The building was the first of three commercial structures designed by Blaine & Olsen in the Spanish Eclectic Revival style. It was followed by El Paseo Building (1928) and La Ribera Hotel (1929).

In 1974, the La Bohème was established by Belgian-born Walter Georis, a Carmel artist and restauranteur. In 1978, he sold La Bohème to one of their top waiters and opened the Casanova Restaurant. Thirty-seven years later, the Georis family were back at La Bohème, which they remodeled and opened as La Bicyclette Restaurant.

Historic preservation

On September 4, 2002, the Kocher building was designated as an important commercial building in the city's Downtown Historic District Property Survey, because it is the best example of Spanish Colonial Revival substyle of Spanish Eclectic style in Carmel. It was the first steel-framed concrete commercial building construction project in Carmel.

See also
 Spanish Colonial Revival architecture

References

External links

 Downtown Conservation District Historic Property Survey

1928 establishments in California
Carmel-by-the-Sea, California
Buildings and structures in Monterey County, California
Spanish Colonial Revival architecture in California